Peter Liguori (born January 7, 1960) is an American business executive who most recently held the position of president and chief executive officer of Tribune Media; he departed the company at the end of March 2017. He was appointed to the positions in January 2013, and is also a member of Tribune Media Company's board of directors. During his tenure, the company acquired Local TV Holdings, LLC, doubling the size of its local television station group, and Gracenote, combining it with Tribune Media Services to form one of the world's leading providers of entertainment metadata.

Liguori was a member of Yahoo!'s board from 2012 to 2014.

Before Tribune, Liguori served as chief operating officer of Discovery Communications. Before joining Discovery in 2009, Liguori served as chairman of entertainment for Fox, credited with helping the channel FX grow in prominence. Prior to assuming that position in 2005, Liguori was president and CEO of News Corporation's FX Networks since 1998, overseeing business and programming operations for FX and Fox Movie Channel.

Liguori joined Fox/Liberty Networks in 1996 as senior vice president of marketing, for a new joint venture, which now includes Fox Sports Net, FX, Fox Sports World, Speed, and National Geographic Channel. Before joining Fox, Liguori was vice president, consumer marketing, at HBO. He also held several positions in HBO's Home Video Division, including vice president, marketing, and senior vice president, marketing. Before HBO, he worked in advertising at Ogilvy & Mather and Saatchi & Saatchi.

Liguori produced the independent feature film Big Night.

Liguori was elected to the board of trustees for the Paley Center for Media in October 2014.

In 2013, Liguori left Discovery to become CEO of Tribune Media which owned 23 television stations, WGN America on national cable, Chicago's WGN-AM radio station, several news and information websites and about a third of the Food Network.

In March 2017, Peter Liguori stepped down as CEO.

References

Directors of Yahoo!
American corporate directors
American chief executives in the media industry
Living people
1960 births
Fox Broadcasting Company executives
Presidents of Fox Broadcasting Company Entertainment